Rainier II, Lord of Monaco (1350–1407), was the monarch of Monaco from June 29, 1352 to August 15, 1357. He was the son of Charles I, Lord of Monaco, and Lucchina Spinola. He ruled jointly with his father Charles I, Lord of Monaco, his father's uncle Antonio, Lord of Monaco and his brother Gabriele, Lord of Monaco. He yielded Monaco to the besieging Genoese for 20,000 fl. but retained Menton and Roquebrune.

He was Admiral of Languedoc and Seneschal of Piedmont. He fought with the French army in the Battle of Poitiers. France's terrible losses in that epic battle led to sweeping military reforms by King Charles V of France. Monaco's port benefited directly from these. While escorting convoys of French merchant ships in the English Channel, he was captured by John of Lancaster, 1st Duke of Bedford. John of Lancaster sold his noble prisoner to his King, Edward III of England.

Marriage and issue
First childless marriage to Maria del Carretto, daughter of Giorgio Marchese di Finale e Noli (Marquis/Margrave of Final and Noli) & his wife Leonora Fieschi. 

He married  secondly to Isabella Asinari. 

Issue:

 Ambroise, Lord of Monaco
 Antonie, Lord of Monaco (alternately Antoine)
 Giacomo of Monaco
 Giovanna of Monaco
 Giovanni I (Jean I, Lord of Monaco)
 Gaspare of Monaco
 Maria of Monaco
 Griffeta of Monaco
 Enrico of Monaco

Succession
He was succeeded by his three sons Ambroise, Antoine, and Jean who ruled Monaco jointly.

Notes 

1350 births
1407 deaths
14th-century Lords of Monaco
Lords of Monaco
House of Grimaldi
Roman Catholic monarchs
French prisoners of war in the Hundred Years' War